The 1840 United States presidential election in Pennsylvania took place between October 30 and December 2, 1840, as part of the 1840 United States presidential election. Voters chose 30 representatives, or electors to the Electoral College, who voted for President and Vice President.

Pennsylvania voted for Whig challenger William Henry Harrison over Democratic incumbent Martin Van Buren by just 334 votes, a margin of 0.12%. It is the narrowest margin of victory in a presidential election in Pennsylvania history, with Donald Trump's 2016 win following close behind at 0.72%.

Results

See also
 List of United States presidential elections in Pennsylvania

References

Pennsylvania
1840
1840 Pennsylvania elections